A Gau badge (Gau-Abzeichen) or Gau Commemorate Badges (Gau-Traditions, Gau-Ehrenzeichen) were a political award of the Nazi Party, issued by various Gauleiters of the Nazi political districts to recognize loyal service or to commemorate an event. A Gau of Nazi Germany, which was a geographical region parallel to the traditional German states (known as Länder). The Gau badges were considered Party awards, but were not recognized as national awards. Regulations for award were determined by the Gauleiter as were any award degrees. They could be worn at any time, except when wearing the Golden Party Badge. A few were issued in different classes, such as silver and gold.

List of Gau badges
 
 General Gau Badge (1923 and 1925)
 Thuringia Gau Badge
 Baden Gau Badge
 East Hannover Gau Badge
 Essen Gau Badge
 Berlin Gau Badge
 Danzig Gau Badge
 East Prussia Gau Badge
 Wartheland Badge
 Sudetenland Badge

Notes

References 

Orders, decorations, and medals of Nazi Germany
Nazi Gaue